No Strain is an album by American blues pianist Memphis Slim which was recorded in 1960 and released on Bluesville, a sublabel of Prestige Records. It was reissued by Fantasy in 1972 as part of the double LP Raining the Blues, along with Just Blues, another album from the same sessions.

Reception

In his review for AllMusic, Stephen Cook says "Both at the keyboard and the mic, alone or with company, Slim shows why he was one of the most urbane and original of blues giants."

Track listing 
All compositions by Peter Chatman except where noted.
 "Darling, I Miss You So" – 3:11  
 "Lonesome Traveler" – 2:44  
 "No Strain" – 6:16  
 "Don't Think You're Smart" – 3:33 
 "Raining the Blues" – 3:46 
 "You're Gonna Need My Help One Day" – 3:14 
 "Angel Child" – 3:07 
 "Fast and Free" – 1:56 
 "My Baby Left Me" – 3:04    
 "Lucille" – 2:16 
 "Nice Stuff" (Chatman-Thomas) – 3:27

Personnel 
Memphis Slim – piano, vocals
Lafayette Thomas – guitar
Wendell Marshall – double bass
Buster 'Harpie' Brown – harmonica

References 

 

1961 albums
Memphis Slim albums
Bluesville Records albums
Albums recorded at Van Gelder Studio